The Grivola (3,969 m) is a mountain in the Graian Alps in Italy. It lies between the  Valsavarenche and the Cogne Valley.

Etymology 
Grivola was named in different ways in the past:
 Pic de Cogne
 Grivolet
 Bec de Grivola
 Aiguille de Grivola

"Grivola" firstly appeared in 1845. Giuseppe Giacosa says is comes from Valdôtain griva, meaning song thrush. Joseph-Marie Henry indicated grivoline, a pretty young girl, as for Jungfrau. Paul-Louis Rousset says that the origin is gri in Valgrisenche Valdôtain, meaning "loose stones".

SOIUSA classification 
According to SOIUSA (International Standardized Mountain Subdivision of the Alps) the mountain is classified in the following way:
 main part = Western Alps
 major sector = North-Western Alps
 section = Graian Alps
 subsection = North-eastern Graian Alps
 supergroup = Catena del Gran Paradiso
 group = Gruppo Grivola-Gran Serra
 subgroup = Sottogruppo della Grivola
 code = I/B-7.IV-A.3.b

Huts
 Rifugio Federico Chabod (2,750 m)
 Bivacco Luciano Gratton (3,198 m)
 Bivacco Mario Balzola (3,477 m)
 Bivacco Mario Gontier (2,309 m)
 Rifugio Vittorio Emanuele II (2,732 m)
 Rifugio Vittorio Sella (2,588 m)

See also

List of mountains of the Alps above 3000 m

References

Maps
 Italian official cartography (Istituto Geografico Militare - IGM); on-line version: www.pcn.minambiente.it
 I.G.C. (Istituto Geografico Centrale) - Carta dei sentieri e dei rifugi  1:50.000 scale n.3 Parco Nazionale del Gran Paradiso and 1:25.000 n.101 Gran Paradiso, La Grivola, Cogne

External links
 Grivola on SummitPost
 Grivola on Camptocamp

Mountains of the Graian Alps
Alpine three-thousanders
Mountains of Aosta Valley